Pelargoderus bipunctatus is a species of beetle in the family Cerambycidae. It was described by Dalman in 1815. It is known from Java.

References

bipunctatus
Beetles described in 1815